Sikhs have a given name and one or both of a surname and a Khalsa name. The surname may be a family name (based on the name of the ancestral village) or a caste name. Different castes still exist today in some aspects of Punjabi culture; similarly to the Hindu caste system, this system is based on employment (ex. jatt signifies the farming caste).

On becoming a Khalsa, the Sikh undertakes the obligation to wear the physical symbols of this status (the Five Ks) and takes the name "lion", usually romanized as Singh, if a man, or /kaur/ "the Crown Princess" for female, usually romanized as Kaur, if a woman. (Note that Singh is spelled irregularly: it is written /singh/ but pronounced /siṅg) These names reflect the strong egalitarianism of the Sikh religion. The adopting of the Khalsa name is symbolic for being a member of a larger family or faith. These names were originally intended to replace the Sikh's original surname, which was often a caste name.

Some Sikhs do replace their original surname with their Khalsa name, but many retain their original surname and add the Khalsa name before it. Thus, a man born Sandeep Brar should become Sandeep Singh but more likely will become Sandeep Singh Brar. Similarly, a woman born Harjeet Gill should become Harjeet Kaur or Harjeet Kaur Gill.

First Names

Sikhs use a set of several hundred given names, all or nearly all meaningful, usually with a religious or moral theme. For example, Ujjal means "bright, clean, holy". The process of choosing a Sikh's first name, known as the Naam Karan, occurs following the first few days of their birth, in a ceremony called the Hukamnama (referring to a hymn from the Guru Granth Sahib as the will from God); a family often selects a name for a child by opening the Sikh holy scripture, the Guru Granth Sahib to a certain "aang" and choosing a name that begins with the first letter of the first word on the "aang". 

Sikh given names are gender neutral, generally formed of a prefix and a suffix (ex. Har/jeet/). There is however, a gender connotation attached when pronouncing a name, say Parkāśh for example; it may be either male or female, but /parakāśō/ is female while /parakāśū/ is male.

Last Names

In Sikhism, women don't change their surnames after marriage - this is due to the fact that each partner keeps Singh and Kaur respectively, who use their preferred names). Again, Punjabi culture generally contradicts this as women are expected to take their husband's family name. Their daughters would then generally have a given name, as well as the Khalsa name and their father's last name, which is usually the name of the father's village; for example, a girl with the name Harjeet, whose father's last name is Aulakh, would then become Harjeet Kaur Aulakh (meaning "Harjeet, princess of Aulakh"). In spite that this system is not permitted for Sikhs as it reinforces both tribalism and the patriarchy, it is the most widely used naming system amongst non-initiated Sikhs (and still prevalent among initiated Sikhs). Sikh girls take on last name of Singh, a practice more common in larger cities. 

Many Sikhs use the sole Singh and Kaur (without any other family name). Initiation is not necessary to use these Sikh last names.  Some believers maintain that this practice of naming without using the word Singh or Kaur is manmat (Against the will of the Guru) and is prohibited in the Rehat Maryada (The way of living of Sikhs).

See also 

 Sikh titles
 Indian names
 Indian honourifics

References

External links
List of names from SikhNames.com Comprehensive list of Sikh names, their meanings and pronunciation, sorted alphabetically in English or Gurmukhi.